Tilesina is a monospecific genus of ray-finned fish belonging to the subfamily Brachyopsinae in the family Agonidae. Its only species is Tilesina gibbosa, a species found in the northwestern Pacific Ocean. This species grows to a length of  TL.

References
 

Brachyopsinae
Monotypic fish genera
Fish described in 1904